The 2017 Asian Women's Club Volleyball Championship was the 18th edition of the Asian Women's Club Volleyball Championship, an international volleyball club tournament organised by the Asian Volleyball Confederation (AVC) with Volleyball Federation of the Republic of Kazakhstan (VFRK). It was held in Ust-Kamenogorsk, Kazakhstan from 25 to 31 May 2017. The tournament will serve as the Asian qualifiers for the 2018 FIVB Volleyball Women's Club World Championship with the champion qualifying for the world championship.

The matches was played in only one stadium in Ust-Kamenogorsk: Boris Alexandrov Sports Palace. It was the second time that Kazakhstan and the first time that Ust-Kamenogorsk had hosted the tournament. As hosts, Kazakhstan automatically participated for the tournament, while the remaining 7 teams.

Participated teams

Qualification

Pools composition
The teams were seeded based on their final ranking at the 2016 Asian Women's Club Volleyball Championship. The host country and the top 7 ranked teams were seed in the Serpentine system. The 7 remaining teams were drawn on 27 February 2017 in Bangkok, Thailand.

Ranking from the previous edition was shown in brackets except the host (who ranked 4th) and the teams who did not participate, which were denoted by (-).

Squads

Venue
The tournament was hosted in Boris Alexandrov Sports Palace, located in Ust-Kamenogorsk, East Kazakhstan.

Pool standing procedure
The following procedures shall be followed to determine the ranking of teams in a pool:

 Number of matches won
 Match points
 Sets ratio
 Points ratio
 Result of the last match between the tied teams

Match won 3–0 or 3–1: 3 match points for the winner, 0 match points for the loser
Match won 3–2: 2 match points for the winner, 1 match point for the loser

Preliminary round
All times are in Kazakhstan Standard Time (UTC+06:00).

Pool A

|}

|}

Pool B

|}

|}

Final round

Bracket

Quarter-finals

|}

Fifth-Eighth place play-offs

|}

Semi-finals

|}

Seventh place match

|}

Fifth place match

|}

Third place match

|}

Final

|}

Final standing

Medalists

Awards

Most Valuable Player
   (Supreme Chonburi)
Popular Player
   (Altay)
Best Setter
   (Tianjin Bohai Bank)
Best Outside Spikers
   (Supreme Chonburi)
   (Altay)

Best Middle Blockers
   (Supreme Chonburi)
   (Altay)
Best Opposite Spiker
   (Hisamitsu Springs)
Best Libero 
   (Hisamitsu Springs)

Notes

References

Asian Women's Club Volleyball Championship
Asian Volleyball Championship
International volleyball competitions hosted by Kazakhstan
2017 in Kazakhstani sport
May 2017 sports events in Kazakhstan